The 2020 ITF Women's World Tennis Tour is the 2020 edition of the second-tier tour for women's professional tennis. It is organised by the International Tennis Federation and is a tier below the WTA Tour. The ITF Women's World Tennis Tour includes tournaments with prize money ranging from $15,000 up to $100,000.

Key

Month

January

February

March

Notes

References

External links 
 International Tennis Federation (ITF)

 1